Techera is a surname. Notable people with the surname include:

Cristian Techera (born 1992), Uruguayan footballer
Jonathan Techera (born 1989), Uruguayan footballer
Rubén Techera (born 1946), Uruguayan footballer
Willington Techera (born 1985), Uruguayan footballer

See also
Teixeira